Labeobarbus macroceps is a species of ray-finned fish in the genus Labeobarbus from The Democratic Republic of the Congo.

References

Footnotes 
 

macroceps
Fish described in 1936
Cyprinid fish of Africa
Endemic fauna of the Democratic Republic of the Congo